The Bangweulu Wetlands is a wetland ecosystem adjacent to Lake Bangweulu in north-eastern Zambia. The area has been designated as one of the world's most important wetlands by the Ramsar Convention and an "Important Bird Area" by BirdLife International. African Parks began managing Bangweulu in partnership with Zambia's Department of National Parks and Wildlife with the establishment of the Bangweulu Wetland Management Board in 2008.

Overview
The Bangweulu Wetlands ecosystem was first described in the 1940s. Bangweulu, which means "where the water meets the sky", is located mostly within Zambia's Northern Province and recognized by the Ramsar Convention as one of the world's most important wetlands. The  region has floodplains, seasonally flooded grasslands, woodlands, and permanent swamps fed by the Chambeshi, Luapula, Lukulu, and Lulimala rivers. The nonprofit conservation organization African Parks manages a  area of the greater Bangweulu ecosystem.

Flora and fauna

The ecosystem has Cyperus papyrus, floating grasses, miombo woodland, and reeds that support large populations of crocodiles, fish, and water birds. Mammals include buffalo, Burchell's zebra, bushbuck, common tsessebe, elephants, hippopotamus, hyenas, jackals, oribi, reedbuck, roan and sable antelope, and sitatunga. Bangweulu has the only remaining significant population of the black lechwe; There were an estimated 36,600 reported in 2020. Millions of straw-coloured fruit bats migrate to Bangweulu's Mushitu swamp forest in Kasanka National Park. In 2016, African Parks partnered with Fondation Segré to relocate 600 animals, including hartebeest, impala, and puku, into the wetlands. Cheetahs were reintroduced to the reserve in late 2020, after almost a century of their absence. 

Bangweulu has been designated as an "Important Bird Area" by BirdLife International. The wetlands are home to more than 400 bird species, including cormorants, ducks, egrets, geese, herons, ibises, pygmy goose, and waders. Most notable is the shoebill, a vulnerable species threatened by habitat burning for farming, competition with fisheries, wildlife trade, and other disturbances. Other species recorded in Bangweulu include the great white pelican, saddle-billed stork, African spoonbill, and wattled crane.

Human–wildlife conflict

Bangweulu encompasses several villages, and an estimated 50,000–90,000 people depend on the wetlands, resulting in human–wildlife conflict. The ecosystem is threatened by habitat burning for farming, overfishing, and poaching. The increased use of mosquito nets for fishing has decreased fish populations in Bangweulu and throughout Zambia. To combat these problems, African Parks developed several community programs and enterprise projects, including bee-keeping, sustainable fisheries management, and reproductive health education. As a result, poaching and other illegal activities have been largely contained, and fish stocks have managed to recover.

Conservation
In 2008, African Parks began managing Bangweulu with the establishment of the Bangweulu Wetland Management Board, which includes representation by African Parks, the Zambia Wildlife Authority, and six community members. Funding was secured by African Parks and the United Nations Development Programme (UNDP). Through this partnership, African Parks is responsible for all management and operations of Bangweulu, including law enforcement, community development, biodiversity conservation, infrastructure and economic development. This public-private and community partnership is part of the Community Partnership Park concept created by the Ministry of Lands, Natural Resources and Environment Protection and Zambia Wildlife Authority's "Reclassification and Effective Management of National Protected Areas System" project. According to UNDP, the project seeks to "improve the management of existing Protected Areas through law enforcement and to propose new protected area categories to ensure the community owns and manages the natural resources in a sustainable manner".

Past partners supporting Bangweulu Wetlands include the Bangweulu Wetlands Management Board and Kasanka Trust; current major funders supporting Bangweuu include WWF-The Netherlands, WWF-Zambia, and the Zambian Department of National Parks and Wildlife, according to African Parks. The Working for Water Project's mission is to survey and protect Africa's major wetlands, including Bangweulu, the Niger and Okavango deltas, and Sudd and Zambezi. The University of Cape Town's Percy FitzPatrick Institute of African Ornithology has worked to create conservation plans for the shoebill. African Parks and Fondation Segré's "Bangweulu Wetlands Wildlife Reintroduction Project" was initiated in 2016 and seeks to "recreate an ecologically viable protected area with the capacity to become sustainable".

See also
 Wildlife of Zambia

References

Further reading

External links

 
 

African Parks (organisation)
Nature conservation in Zambia
Floodplains of Africa
Lake Bangweulu
Wetlands of Zambia
Zambezian flooded grasslands
Important Bird Areas of Zambia